GLib  is a bundle of three (formerly five) low-level system libraries written in C and developed mainly by GNOME. GLib's code was separated from GTK, so it can be used by software other than GNOME and has been developed in parallel ever since.

Features
GLib provides advanced data structures, such as memory chunks, doubly and singly linked lists, hash tables, dynamic strings and string utilities, such as a lexical scanner, string chunks (groups of strings), dynamic arrays, balanced binary trees, N-ary trees, quarks (a two-way association of a string and a unique integer identifier), keyed data lists, relations, and tuples. Caches provide memory management.

GLib implements functions that provide threads, thread programming and related facilities such as primitive variable access, mutexes, asynchronous queues, secure memory pools, message passing and logging, hook functions (callback registering) and timers. GLib also includes message passing facilities such as byte order conversion and I/O channels.

Some other features of GLib include:
 standard macros
 warnings and assertions
 dynamic loading of modules

Components
The GLib package consisted of five libraries, but they were all merged into one library, since then named simply GLib, and are no longer sustained as standalone libraries. The original libraries were:
 GObject, an object system including the type system GType
 GLib
 GModule
 GThread
 GIO

Of these, three continue to reside in distinct subdirectories of the source tree, and so can be thought of as discrete components: GLib, GObject, and GIO. These can be thought of as a software stack: GObject relies on GLib, and GIO provides higher-level functionality that uses both.

History
GLib began as part of the GTK+ project, now named GTK. However, before releasing GTK+ version 2, the project's developers decided to separate code from GTK+ that was not for graphical user interfaces (GUIs), thus creating GLib as a separate software bundle. GLib was released as a separate library so other developers, those not using the GUI-related parts of GTK+, could use the non-GUI parts of the library without the overhead of depending on the full GUI library.

Since GLib is a cross-platform library, applications using it to interface with the operating system are usually portable across different operating systems without major changes.

Releases
Glib is undergoing active development. For a current overview see https://gitlab.gnome.org/GNOME/glib/-/blob/main/NEWS. The table below documents major patch notes from 1998 to 2022.

Similar projects
Other libraries provide low-level functions and implementations of data structures, including:
 Microsoft Foundation Class Library (MFC) – An object-oriented C++ wrapper library to the C-based Windows API which also includes some data structures and other convenience functionality
 Standard Template Library (STL) – C++ library for data structures and algorithms
 Boost – provides some functions for C++, such as threading primitives, similar to what GLib does for C
 QtCore – core API of the Qt Framework
 wxBase – non-GUI functions of the wxWidgets library
 The Apache Portable Runtime and Apple Core Foundation have a large functional overlap with GLib, and provide many similar OS-portable threading, network and data structure implementations in C.

References

External links

 
 GLib API documentation
 GLib Git Source Tree

 
C (programming language) libraries
Free computer libraries
Free software programmed in C
GNOME libraries
GTK
Software using the LGPL license